Pseudorhaphitoma heptagona is a small sea snail, a marine gastropod mollusk in the family Mangeliidae.

Description
The length of the shell attains 4.4 mm, its diameter 1.6 mm.

Distribution
This marine species occurs off Samoa.

References

 Dunker, G. 1871. Mollusca nova Musei Godeffroy Hamburgensis. Malakozoologische Blätter 18: 150-175
 R.N. Kilburn, Turridae (Mollusca: Gastropoda) of southern Africa and Mozambique. Part 7. Subfamily Mangeliinae, section 2; Annals of the Natal Museum 34, pp 317 - 367 (1993)

External links
 
 

heptagona
Gastropods described in 1871